Møller scattering is the name given to electron-electron scattering in quantum field theory, named after the Danish physicist Christian Møller.  The electron interaction that is idealized in Møller scattering forms the theoretical basis of many familiar phenomena such as the repulsion of electrons in the helium atom.  While formerly many particle colliders were designed specifically for electron-electron collisions, more recently electron-positron colliders have become more common.  Nevertheless, Møller scattering remains a paradigmatic process within the theory of particle interactions.

We can express this process in the usual notation, often used in particle physics:

In quantum electrodynamics, there are two tree-level Feynman diagrams describing the process: a t-channel diagram in which the electrons exchange a photon and a similar u-channel diagram.  Crossing symmetry, one of the tricks often used to evaluate Feynman diagrams, in this case implies that Møller scattering should have the same cross section as Bhabha scattering (electron-positron scattering).

In the electroweak theory the process is instead described by four tree-level diagrams: the two from QED and an identical pair in which a Z boson is exchanged instead of a photon.  The weak force is purely left-handed, but the weak and electromagnetic forces mix into the particles we observe.  The photon is symmetric by construction, but the Z boson prefers left-handed particles to right-handed particles.  Thus the cross sections for left-handed electrons and right-handed differ.  The difference was first noticed by the Russian physicist Yakov Zel'dovich in 1959, but at the time he believed the parity violating asymmetry (a few hundred parts per billion) was too small to be observed.  This parity violating asymmetry can be measured by firing a polarized beam of electrons through an unpolarized electron target (liquid hydrogen, for instance), as was done by an experiment at the Stanford Linear Accelerator Center, SLAC-E158. The asymmetry in Møller scattering is

QED computation 

The Møller scattering can be calculated from the QED point-of-view, at the tree-level, with the help of the two diagrams shown on this page. These two diagrams are contributing at leading order from the QED point-of-view. If we are taking in account the weak force, which is unified with the electromagnetic force at high energy, then we have to add two tree-level diagram for the exchange of a  boson. Here we will focus our attention on a strict tree-level QED computation of the cross section, which is rather instructive but maybe not the most accurate description from a physical point-of-view.

Before the derivation, we write the 4-momenta as (and for incoming electrons, and for outgoing electrons, and ):

The Mandelstam variables are:

These Mandelstam variables satisfy the identity: .

According to the two diagrams on this page, the matrix element of t-channel is

the matrix element of u-channel is

So the sum is

Therefore,

To calculate the unpolarized cross section, we average over initial spins and sum over final spins, with the factor 1/4 (1/2 for each incoming electron):

where we have used the relation . We would next calculate the traces.

The first term in the braces is

Here , and we have used the -matrix identity

Similarly, the second term is 

Using the -matrix identities

and the identity of Mandelstam variables: , we get the third term

Therefore,

Substitute in the momentums we have set here, which are

Finally we get the unpolarized cross section

In the nonrelativistic limit, 

In the ultrarelativistic limit,

References

External links
SLAC E158:  Measuring the Electron's WEAK Charge

Quantum electrodynamics
Scattering theory